Undressed is the debut studio album by Swedish singer-songwriter Kim Cesarion. It was released on 18 June 2014 through Aristotracks, RCA Records, and Sony Music. The first single, "Undressed" was released on 22 March 2013. It became a top ten hit in Australia, Denmark, Luxembourg, and Sweden.

Promotion 
Seven promotional singles were released from Undressed through Spotify preceding the album's release: "Can't Love Nobody" on 11 June, "Trade Ya" on 12 June, "Bad Thing" on 13 June, and "Girls" on 14 June, "Angel Wings" on 15 June, "X" on 16 June, and "One True Lover" on 17 June 2014.

Track listing 

Notes
 signifies an additional producer

Sample credits
"Angel Wings" contains a sample from "Make You Feel" by Alina Baraz & Galimatias.
"Amen" pastor performed by R.A. Vernon from The Grace Factor.

Charts

Release history

References

2014 debut albums
Kim Cesarion albums